SSTB could refer to the following:

 The Second Stage Turbine Blade, a studio album by rock band Coheed and Cambria. 
 Sita Sings the Blues, a 2008 animated feature film by American artist Nina Paley.